Karel Jaromír Erben (7 November 1811 – 21 November 1870) was a Czech folklorist and poet of the mid-19th century, best known for his collection Kytice, which contains poems based on traditional and folkloric themes.

He also wrote Písně národní v Čechách ("Folk Songs of Bohemia") which contains 500 songs and Prostonárodní české písně a říkadla ("Czech Folk Songs and Nursery Rhymes"), a five-part book that brings together most of Czech folklore.

Biography
He was born on 7 November 1811 in Miletín near Jičín. He went to college in Hradec Králové. Then, in 1831, he went to Prague where he studied philosophy and later law. He started working in the National Museum with František Palacký in 1843. He became editor of a Prague's newspaper in 1848. Two years later, in 1850, he became archives' secretary of the National Museum. He died on 21 November 1870 of tuberculosis.

He was member of the Czech National Revival, and politically he was also a sympathizer of Illyrian movement and Russian Slavophilia for entrenched populations of Slavs in other parts of the world.

As practitioner of his ideals, he published Sto prostonárodních pohádek a pověstí slovanských v nářečích původních ("One Hundred Slavic Folk Tales and Legends in Original Dialects"), also known by its subtitle Čitanka slovanská ("Slavic Reader"), that was influenced by the Grimms' collection of fairy tales. It included such pieces as tale No. 2, Dlouhý, Široký a Bystrozraký ("Long, Broad and Sharpsight", translated into English by Albert Henry Wratislaw). The entire volume was translated by W. W. Strickland, and eventually published as Panslavonic Folk-lore in 1930.

He is also considered an important poet of the Czech literary Romanticism in the mid-19th century, with his collection of a dozen literary ballads entitled Kytice z pověstí národních ("A Bouquet of Folk Legends", 1853).

Selected works
 Písně národní v Čechách (Folk Songs of Bohemia) (1842–1845); contains 500 songs
 Kytice z pověstí národních (A Bouquet of Folk Legends) (1853, expanded edition 1861) (English edition, 2012)
 Sto prostonárodních pohádek a pověstí slovanských v nářečích původních: čitanka slovanská s vysvětlením slov (One Hundred Slavic Folk Tales and Legends in Original Dialects: a Slavic Reader with Vocabulary, 1865)
 Vybrané báje a pověsti národní jiných větví slovanských (Selection of Folk Tales and Legends from Other Slavic Branches) (1869)
 Prostonárodní české písně a říkadla (Czech Folk Songs and Nursery Rhymes) (1864); 5-part collection of Czech folklore
 České pohádky (Czech Fairy Tales)

References
Citations

Bibliography

 Profile by School of Modern Languages and Cultures at University of Glasgow

External links

 
 
 About English translation on Radio Prague

1811 births
1870 deaths
People from Miletín
People from the Kingdom of Bohemia
Czech folk-song collectors
Czech poets
Czech male poets
19th-century poets
19th-century male writers
Corresponding members of the Saint Petersburg Academy of Sciences
Burials at Olšany Cemetery
19th-century musicologists